Farlam is a civil parish in the Carlisle district of Cumbria, England.  It contains 13 listed buildings that are recorded in the National Heritage List for England.  All the listed buildings are designated at Grade II, the lowest of the three grades, which is applied to "buildings of national importance and special interest".  The parish contains the village of Farlam and the smaller settlements of Kirkhouse and Hallbankgate, and is otherwise rural.  Some of the listed buildings are remnants of coal mining in the parish; these include offices later converted into houses, and a gasworks.  The other listed buildings include houses, farmhouses, farm buildings, a church, memorials, and a guide post.


Buildings

Notes and references

Notes

Citations

Sources

Lists of listed buildings in Cumbria